The South American worm lizard (Amphisbaena angustifrons) is a worm lizard species in the family Amphisbaenidae. It is found in Argentina, Paraguay, and Bolivia.

References

Amphisbaena (lizard)
Reptiles described in 1861
Taxa named by Edward Drinker Cope